Zaneta Felice Antoinetta Mascarenhas is an Australian politician of Indian descent. She was elected to the Australian House of Representatives at the 2022 Australian federal election for the Division of Swan.

Early life and career
Mascarenhas was born in Kalgoorlie, Western Australia, to Indian immigrant parents of Goan descent who migrated from Kenya. She grew up in Kambalda and attended John Paul College in Kalgoorlie. She studied science and engineering at Curtin University in Perth where she became President of the Student Guild. She worked as an engineer for 15 years in Western Australia and Victoria, including as a FIFO engineer. She also volunteered for The Climate Reality Project.

Political career
Mascarenhas contested the Labor Party preselection for the Division of Swan for the 2019 Australian federal election, but withdrew, enabling Hannah Beazley to be preselected. Mascarenhas is part of the Labor Left faction of the Labor Party, and she is supported by the Australian Manufacturing Workers' Union. In June 2021, she beat Fiona Reid to win preselection for Swan at the 2022 Australian federal election.

At the 2022 election on 21 May, Mascarenhas won the Division of Swan, succeeding retiring Liberal Party politician Steve Irons and defeating his party's candidate Kristy McSweeney.

See also
Electoral results for the Division of Swan

References

Living people
21st-century Australian politicians
Australian Labor Party members of the Parliament of Australia
Labor Left politicians
Members of the Australian House of Representatives for Swan
People from Kalgoorlie
Australian people of Goan descent
Australian women engineers
Members of the Australian House of Representatives
Politicians of Indian descent
Women members of the Australian House of Representatives
Year of birth missing (living people)
21st-century Australian women politicians